Phra Dhammavisuddhikavi (Pali name Pichitr Thitavanno), born June 24, 1936, in Songkhla Province, is a South Thailand Buddhist teacher, writer and meditation master for Buddhist monks, novices and the general public in Thailand.

Biography
Phra Dhammavisuddhikavi was ordained a novice in 1953 and a monk in 1956 at Wat Somana Vihara, Bangkok. He is a graduate of Pali Studies Grade 9, the highest grade of Pali studies in Thailand. He has a bachelor's degree in Religious Studies (Honours) from Mahamakut Buddhist University, Thailand, and a High Certificate from the Training institute for Dhammaduta (Buddhist missionary work). He also holds a M.A. in Sanskrit Literature and Diploma in Hindi from B.H.U. India.
Phra Dhammavisuddhikavi is the Lord Abbot of Wat Somanasivihara and Ex-Vice Rector for Academic Affairs at Mahamakut Buddhist University, Bangkok, Thailand. He has written 70 books on Buddhism.

Sources 
Preface to: Ven. Phra Dhammavisuddhikavi, A Buddhist Way of Mental Training, B.E.2544/A.D. 2001, Chuan Printing Press, Bangkok.

Living people
Theravada Buddhism writers
Thai Theravada Buddhist monks
Thai Buddhist spiritual teachers
1936 births